The Most Beautiful Moment in Life On Stage Tour, also known as the 2015 BTS Live "The Most Beautiful Moment in Life On Stage", was the third concert tour headlined by South Korean boy band BTS to promote their The Most Beautiful Moment in Life series, including their EPs The Most Beautiful Moment Life, Pt.1, Pt. 2 (2015) and the compilation album The Most Beautiful Moment in Life: Young Forever (2016). The tour began on November 27, 2015 in South Korea. An extension to the tour, titled 2016 BTS Live "The Most Beautiful Moment in Life On Stage: Epilogue" began in South Korea on May 7, 2016. In all, the entire tour attracted over 182,500 spectators at 13 cities in 7 countries.

Background 
On September 8, 2015, BTS released a 12 minute-long trailer titled "The Most Beautiful Moment in Life On Stage: Prologue" on Youtube followed by a poster released September 14, 2015, announcing the tour with listed dates for three shows held at the SK Olympic Handball Gymnasium in South Korea. An additional two dates at the Yokohama Arena and two dates at the Kobe World Memorial Hall in Japan were later added and sold out, prompting the listing of a third date at the World Memorial Hall for December 28, 2015. During the tour, BTS canceled their December 27th and December 28th concerts in Kobe due to complaints of dizziness by Suga and V during rehearsals that led to medical evaluation at a local hospital. The two concerts were later rescheduled for March 22nd and 23rd, 2016.

Setlist 
The following set list is obtained from the show on November 27, 2015 in Seoul, South Korea. It is not intended to represent all dates throughout the tour.

 "Hold Me Tight"
 "Let Me Know"
 "Danger"
 "No More Dream"
 "N.O"
 "Converse High"
 "24/7=Heaven"
 "Miss Right"
 "Moving On"
 "Run"
 "Butterfly"
 "Tomorrow"
 "Hip Hop Lover"
 "2nd Grade"
 "Boyz with Fun"
 "Dope"
 "Intro: Skool Luv Affair"
 "War of Hormone"
 "Boy in Luv"

Encore

 "Intro: Never Mind"
 "Ma City"
 "I Need U"

Tour dates

Epilogue extension

Background 
On March 21, 2016, following the release of their first Korean compilation album The Most Beautiful Moment in Life: Young Forever, BTS released a trailer on YouTube and a poster announcing the Most Beautiful Moment in Life On Stage: Epilogue tour extension along with a career landmark show at the Olympic Gymnastics Arena in South Korea. The tour began on May 7, 2016, and continued through the summer in nine other cities in Taiwan, China, Japan, the Philippines and Thailand, bringing together a total of 144,000 spectators. During the concert held in Beijing on July 23, RM suffered a heat stroke and did not participate for the rest of the performances that night.

Setlist 
The following set list is obtained from the show on May 7, 2016, in Seoul, South Korea. It is not intended to represent all dates throughout the tour.

 "Run"
 "Danger"
 "Autumn Leaves"
 "Tomorrow"
 "Butterfly"
 "Love Is Not Over"
 "Outro: House of Cards"
 "Intro: What Am I to You"
 "Boy in Luv"
 "Save Me"
 "Fire"
 "Hip Hop Lover"
 "We Are Bulletproof Pt.2"
 "BTS Cypher Pt.3: Killer"
 "If I Ruled the World"
 "Silver Spoon"
 "Dope"
 "Ma City"
 "Boyz with Fun"
 "Attack on Bangtan"
 "Intro: 2 Cool 4 Skool"
 "No More Dream"

Encore

 "Epilogue: Young Forever"
 "Whalien 52"
 "Miss Right"
 "I Need U"

Tour dates

Accolades

Notes

References 

2015 concert tours
2016 concert tours
BTS concert tours
Concert tours of Asia
Concert tours of South Korea
Concert tours of Japan
Concert tours of Taiwan
Concert tours of China
Concert tours of the Philippines
Concert tours of Thailand